The list of shipwrecks in July 1879 includes ships sunk, foundered, grounded, or otherwise lost during July 1879.

1 July

2 July

3 July

4 July

5 July

6 July

7 July

8 July

9 July

10 July

11 July

12 July

13 July

14 July

15 July

16 July

17 July

18 July

19 July

20 July

21 July

22 July

23 July

24 July

25 July

27 July

28 July

29 July

30 July

31 July

Unknown date

References

Bibliography
Ingram, C. W. N., and Wheatley, P. O., (1936) Shipwrecks: New Zealand disasters 1795–1936. Dunedin, NZ: Dunedin Book Publishing Association.

1879-07
Maritime incidents in July 1879